Abiodun Agunbiade (born 2 January 1983) is a Nigerian former football player. He was a pacey and highly skilful dribbling midfielder that usually played on the right wing. During the final years of his career he played as a striker.

Between summer of 2006 and February 2007, Abiodun and teammate Wayne Srhoj didn't play a single official game, as they claimed their contract with FC Naţional had run out at the end of the 2005–2006 season. After seven months of controversial court hearings and delays, the final decision favoured the players who then signed with the Timișoara based team.

He played one match for Nigeria in a 2005 friendly which ended with a 3–0 loss against Romania.

References

External links

FC Internaţional Curtea de Argeş profile 

1983 births
Living people
Nigerian footballers
Nigeria international footballers
Associação Naval 1º de Maio players
S.C. Braga players
S.C. Braga B players
FC Progresul București players
FC Politehnica Timișoara players
FC Internațional Curtea de Argeș players
Merelinense F.C. players
Liga I players
Expatriate footballers in Romania
Nigerian expatriate sportspeople in Romania
Expatriate footballers in Portugal
Nigerian expatriate sportspeople in Portugal
Plateau United F.C. players
Yoruba sportspeople
People from Zaria
Association football midfielders